Losby Golf and Country Club is a Norwegian golf and country club situated just outside Oslo, Norway. Losby was the host for the SAS Masters tournament 2007 on the Ladies European Tour, won by Suzann Pettersen.

Losby has two separate golf courses, Østmork (18 holes) and Vestmork (9 holes). Both Vestmork and the championship course Østmork were designed by Peter Nordwall.

External links
 Losby's Website
 Ladies European Tour's official site
 SAS Masters Tournament

Golf clubs and courses in Norway